Carlos Alberto Silva Lima (born 20 September 1983), commonly known as Calú, is a Cape Verdean professional  footballer who plays as a midfielder.

Club career
Calú began his career in Cape Verde with Mindelense. He remained with the club from 2001 to 2012.

He then joined Girabola team Progresso Sambizanga ahead of the 2012–13 season.

In 2015, Calú completed a transfer to Zimbru Chișinău of Moldova. He scored four goals in twenty-three appearances for Zimbru before returning to Cape Verde to join Académica.

On 31 January 2017, Calú signed for LigaPro side Gil Vicente in Portugal.

International career
Calú is a member of the Cape Verde football team at international level. He currently has nineteen caps.

Career statistics

Club
.

International
.

Honours

Club
Mindelense
 Cape Verdean Football Championship (1): 2011
 São Vicente Island League (3): 2005–06, 2008–09, 2010–11
 São Vicente Association Cup (5): 2002–03, 2004–05, 2005–06, 2007–08, 2008–09
 São Vicente Cup (1): 2007–08
 São Vicente Super Cup (2): 2005–06, 2008–09

References

External links 
 
 
 

1983 births
Living people
Association football midfielders
Cape Verdean footballers
Cape Verde international footballers
2015 Africa Cup of Nations players
CS Mindelense players
Progresso Associação do Sambizanga players
FC Zimbru Chișinău players
Académica do Mindelo players
Gil Vicente F.C. players
Cape Verdean National Championships players
Girabola players
Moldovan Super Liga players
Liga Portugal 2 players
Sportspeople from Praia
Footballers from Santiago, Cape Verde
Cape Verdean expatriate footballers
Expatriate footballers in Angola
Cape Verdean expatriate sportspeople in Angola
Expatriate footballers in Moldova
Cape Verdean expatriate sportspeople in Moldova
Expatriate footballers in Portugal
Cape Verdean expatriate sportspeople in Portugal